Heckfordbridge or Heckford is a hamlet in the civil parish of Birch, in the county of Essex, England.

The settlement is on the B1022 road, between Colchester and Tiptree. near to Colchester Zoo.

References

External links 

Hamlets in Essex